Miéville is a surname of Swiss origin. It may refer to:

Sir Walter Miéville (1855–1929), British diplomat 
Sir Eric Miéville (1896–1971), British civil servant
Anne-Marie Miéville (born 1945), Swiss filmmaker
China Miéville (born 1972), English fantasy fiction writer
Yves Miéville (born 1983), Swiss football player

Surnames of Swiss origin